The 1979–80 NBA season was the Clippers' 10th season in the NBA and their 2nd season in the city of San Diego.

Draft picks

Roster
{| class="toccolours" style="font-size: 95%; width: 100%;"
|-
! colspan="2" style="background-color: #87CEEB;  color: #FF8C00; text-align: center;" | San Diego Clippers roster
|- style="background-color: #FF8C00; color: #87CEEB;   text-align: center;"
! Players !! Coaches
|-
| valign="top" |
{| class="sortable" style="background:transparent; margin:0px; width:100%;"
! Pos. !! # !! Nat. !! Name !! Ht. !! Wt. !! From
|-

Roster Notes
 This is Marvin Barnes' second tour of duty with the franchise.  He previously played for the Buffalo Braves back in 1977-1978.

Regular season

Game log

|-  style="text-align:center; background:#fbb;"
| 1 || October 12 || Lakers || L 102–103 || Lloyd Free (46) || Nick Weatherspoon (9)|| Lloyd Free (5) || San Diego Sports Arena  8,503 || 0–1 || 
|-  style="text-align:center; background:#bfb;"
| 2 || October 14 || SuperSonics || W 98–93 || Lloyd Free (35) || Swen Nater (16)|| Tied (4) || San Diego Sports Arena  7,242 || 1–1 || 
|-  style="text-align:center; background:#fbb;"
| 3 || October 16 || @ Trail Blazers || L 94–98|| Lloyd Free (24) || Swen Nater (16)|| Lloyd Free (4) || Memorial Coliseum  12,666 || 1–2 || 
|-  style="text-align:center; background:#bfb;"
| 4 || October 18 || Bulls || W 111–107 || Lloyd Free (32) || Swen Nater (14) || Brian Taylor (7) || San Diego Sports Arena  6,844 || 2–2 || 
|-  style="text-align:center; background:#fbb;"
| 5 || October 19 || @ SuperSonics || L 98–106 || Lloyd Free (41) || Swen Nater (18)|| Tied (4) || Kingdome  16,614 || 2–3 || 
|-  style="text-align:center; background:#fbb;"
| 6 || October 22 || @ Jazz || L 109–110 || Lloyd Free (33) || Swen Nater (13)|| World B. Free (4) || Salt Palace  6,122 || 2–4 || 
|-  style="text-align:center; background:#bfb;"
| 7 || October 23 || Nuggets || W 132–127 || Lloyd Free (32) || Swen Nater (12)|| Tied (7) || San Diego Sports Arena  6,660 || 3–4 || 
|-  style="text-align:center; background:#fbb;"
| 8 || October 25 || Bucks || L 115–118 || Lloyd Free (30) || Swen Nater (15)|| Tied (5) || San Diego Sports Arena  6,617 || 3–5 || 
|-  style="text-align:center; background:#bfb;"
| 9 || October 27 || SuperSonics || W 110–105 || Lloyd Free (33) || Nick Weatherspoon (9)|| Lloyd Free (9) || San Diego Sports Arena  7,224 || 4–5 || 
|-  style="text-align:center; background:#fbb;"
| 10 || October 28 || Kings || L 101–106 || Joe Bryant (23) || Swen Nater (13)|| Lloyd Free (5) || San Diego Sports Arena  7,081 || 4–6 || 
|-  style="text-align:center; background:#fbb;"
| 11 || October 31|| Spurs || L 123–130 || Lloyd Free (35) || Swen Nater (21)|| Lloyd Free (6) || San Diego Sports Arena  7,044 || 4–7 || 
|-

|-  style="text-align:center; background:#fbb;"
| 12 || November 2 || Trail Blazers || L 102–123 || Freeman Williams (29) || Swen Nater (12)|| Brian Taylor (4) || San Diego Sports Arena  7,319 || 4–8 || 
|-  style="text-align:center; background:#bfb;"
| 13 || November 3 || Jazz || W 126–109 || Lloyd Free (28) || Swen Nater (19)|| Swen Nater (10) || San Diego Sports Arena  6,428 || 5–8 || 
|-  style="text-align:center; background:#fbb;"
| 14 || November 6 || @ Lakers || L 112–127 || Lloyd Free (29) || Swen Nater (15)|| Joe Bryant (7) || The Forum  12,817 || 5–9 || 
|-  style="text-align:center; background:#bfb;"
| 15 || November 7 || @ Suns || W 114–102 || Lloyd Free (45) || Swen Nater (13)|| Lloyd Free (5) || Arizona Veterans Memorial Coliseum  11,097 || 6–9 || 
|-  style="text-align:center; background:#fbb;"
| 16 || November 9 || @ Bulls || L 92–107 || Freeman Williams (26) || Swen Nater (16)|| Lloyd Free (7) || Chicago Stadium  8,014 || 6–10 || 
|-  style="text-align:center; background:#fbb;"
| 17 || November 10 || @ Bucks || L 104–133 || Freeman Williams (33) || Swen Nater (15)|| Tied (6) || MECCA Arena  10,938 || 6–11 || 
|-  style="text-align:center; background:#fbb;"
| 18 || November 13 || Lakers || L 91–137 || Swen Nater (15) || Swen Nater (10)|| Brian Taylor (7) || San Diego Sports Arena  9,068 || 6–12 || 
|-  style="text-align:center; background:#bfb;"
| 19 || November 16 || Pacers || W 105–97 || Freeman Williams (35) || Swen Nater (15)|| Brian Taylor (6) || San Diego Sports Arena  7,221 || 7–12 || 
|-  style="text-align:center; background:#bfb;"
| 20 || November 18 || Bucks || W 112–96|| Brian Taylor (23) || Swen Nater (21)|| Brian Taylor (9) || San Diego Sports Arena  6,342 || 8–12 || 
|-  style="text-align:center; background:#bfb;"
| 21 || November 20 || Suns || W 117–110 || Brian Taylor (28) || Swen Nater (15)|| Lloyd Free (6) || San Diego Sports Arena  6,992 || 9–12 || 
|-  style="text-align:center; background:#fbb;"
| 22 || November 21 || @ Nuggets || L 84–105 || Lloyd Free (27) || Tied (11)|| Joe Bryant (5) || McNichols Sports Arena  5,922 || 9–13 || 
|-  style="text-align:center; background:#fbb;"
| 23 || November 23 || Kings || L 91–107 || Lloyd Free (32) || Swen Nater (14)|| Lloyd Free (3) || San Diego Sports Arena  6,940 || 9–14 || 
|-  style="text-align:center; background:#bfb;"
| 24 || November 27 || Bulls || W 128–103 || Lloyd Free (23) || Swen Nater (16)|| Tied (7) || San Diego Sports Arena  8,075 || 10–14 || 
|-  style="text-align:center; background:#bfb;"
| 25 || November 28 || @ Warriors || W 114–108 || Lloyd Free (28) || Swen Nater (17)|| Brian Taylor (9) || Oakland-Alameda County Coliseum Arena  10,726 || 11–14 || 
|-  style="text-align:center; background:#fbb;"
| 26 || November 30 || @ 76ers || L 101–104 || Lloyd Free (29) || Swen Nater (16)|| Brian Taylor (7) || The Spectrum  10,726 || 11–15 || 
|-

|-  style="text-align:center; background:#fbb;"
| 27 || December 1 || @ Hawks || L 96–106 || Lloyd Free (35) || Joe Bryant (12)|| Joe Bryant (5) || Omni Coliseum  9,373 || 11–16 || 
|-  style="text-align:center; background:#fbb;"
| 28 || December 4 || @ Cavaliers || L 112–115 || Lloyd Free (28) || Swen Nater (15)|| Freeman Williams (5) || Richfield Coliseum  7,155 || 11–17 || 
|-  style="text-align:center; background:#bfb;"
| 29 || December 6 || Warriors || W 105–103 || Lloyd Free (30) || Swen Nater (11)|| Brian Taylor (6) || San Diego Sports Arena  8,664 || 12–17 || 
|-  style="text-align:center; background:#bfb;"
| 30 || December 7 || @ Lakers || W 116–108 || Lloyd Free (42) || Swen Nater (27)|| Tied (4) || The Forum  12,222 || 13–17 || 
|-  style="text-align:center; background:#bfb;"
| 31 || December 9 || @ Trail Blazers || W 98–96 || Lloyd Free (25) || Swen Nater (16)|| Lloyd Free (6) || Memorial Coliseum  12,666 || 14–17 || 
|-  style="text-align:center; background:#fbb;"
| 32 || December 12 || Rockets || L 107–118 || Lloyd Free (29) || Swen Nater (17)|| Tied (3) || San Diego Sports Arena  6,756 || 14–18 || 
|-  style="text-align:center; background:#bfb;"
| 33 || December 14 || Nuggets || W 112–108 || Lloyd Free (37) || Swen Nater (32)|| Lloyd Free (7) || San Diego Sports Arena  6,684 || 15–18 || 
|-  style="text-align:center; background:#bfb;"
| 34 || December 16 || Pistons || W 113–124 || Lloyd Free (49) || Swen Nater (15) || Tied (5) || San Diego Sports Arena  7,571 || 16–18 || 
|-  style="text-align:center; background:#fbb;"
| 35 || December 18 || @ Kings || L 96–110 || Lloyd Free (25) || Swen Nater (8) || Tied (3) || Municipal Auditorium  6,935 || 16–19 || 
|-  style="text-align:center; background:#bfb;"
| 36 || December 20 || Knicks || W 128–118 || Lloyd Free (32) || Swen Nater (17) || Sidney Wicks (6) || San Diego Sports Arena  6,843 || 17–19 || 
|-  style="text-align:center; background:#bfb;"
| 37 || December 21 || @ Jazz || W 110–98 || Freeman Williams (28) || Joe Bryant (9) || Sidney Wicks (7) || Salt Palace  5,141 || 18–19 || 
|-  style="text-align:center; background:#bfb;"
| 38 || December 23 || Jazz || W 124–118  OT || Lloyd Free (41) || Swen Nater (22) || Lloyd Free (8) || San Diego Sports Arena  6,548 || 19–19 || 
|-  style="text-align:center; background:#fbb;"
| 39 || December 26 || @ SuperSonics || L 104–124 || Brian Taylor (28) || Swen Nater (10) || Sidney Wicks (10) || Kingdome  24,958 || 19–20 || 
|-  style="text-align:center; background:#fbb;"
| 40 || December 27 || Celtics || L 97–118 || Lloyd Free (28) || Swen Nater (15) || Freeman Williams (3) || San Diego Sports Arena  13,841 || 19–21 || 
|-  style="text-align:center; background:#bfb;"
| 41 || December 29 || @ Bullets || W 93–90 || Freeman Williams (24) || Swen Nater (17) || Tied (3) || Capital Centre  15,989 || 20–21 || 
|-

|-  style="text-align:center; background:#bfb;"
| 42 || January 2 || @ Nets || W 103–97 || Lloyd Free (31) || Swen Nater (23) || Freeman Williams (7) || Rutgers Athletic Center  5,204 || 21–21 || 
|-  style="text-align:center; background:#fbb;"
| 43 || January 3 || @ Knicks || L 114–107 || Lloyd Free (30) || Freeman Williams (8) || Tied (4) || Madison Square Garden  11,375 || 21–22 || 
|-  style="text-align:center; background:#fbb;"
| 44 || January 4 || @ Bulls || L 118–121 || Lloyd Free (38) || Swen Nater (11) || Brian Taylor (9) || Chicago Stadium  10,538 || 21–23 || 
|-  style="text-align:center; background:#bfb;"
| 45 || January 6 || SuperSonics || W 105–103 || Lloyd Free (34) || Swen Nater (17) || Tied (7) || San Diego Sports Arena  7,622 || 22–23 || 
|-  style="text-align:center; background:#bfb;"
| 46 || January 8 || @ Kings || W 124–116 || Lloyd Free (33) || Swen Nater (26) || Tied (4) || Municipal Auditorium  7,387 || 23–23 || 
|-  style="text-align:center; background:#bfb;"
| 47 || January 9 || @ Bucks || W 111–107 || Lloyd Free (33) || Swen Nater (14) || Lloyd Free (7) || MECCA Arena  10,938 || 24–23 || 
|-  style="text-align:center; background:#bfb;"
| 48 || January 11 || Warriors || W 116–112 || Lloyd Free (39) || Swen Nater (16) || Brian Taylor (5) || San Diego Sports Arena  8,165 || 25–23 || 
|-  style="text-align:center; background:#bfb;"
| 49 || January 12 || Jazz || W 119–102 || Lloyd Free (32) || Swen Nater (28) || Lloyd Free (7) || San Diego Sports Arena  9,287 || 26–23 || 
|-  style="text-align:center; background:#bfb;"
| 50 || January 16 || Hawks || W 111–108 || Lloyd Free (33) || Swen Nater (16) || Tied (4) || San Diego Sports Arena  11,266 || 27–23 || 
|-  style="text-align:center; background:#fbb;"
| 51 || January 18 || @ Warriors || L 91–92 || Lloyd Free (32) || Swen Nater (17) || Brian Taylor (7) || Oakland-Alameda County Coliseum Arena  7,741 || 27–24 || 
|-  style="text-align:center; background:#fbb;"
| 52 || January 19 || @ Suns || L 123–137 || Freeman Williams (51) || Nick Weatherspoon (8) || Stan Pietkiewicz (8) || Arizona Veterans Memorial Coliseum  12,660 || 27–25 || 
|-  style="text-align:center; background:#fbb;"
| 53 || January 22 || @ Spurs || L 109–129 || Freeman Williams (21) || Sidney Wicks (11) || Sidney Wicks (8) || HemisFair Arena  10,049 || 27–26 || 
|-  style="text-align:center; background:#fbb;"
| 54 || January 23 || @ Rockets || L 110–111  2OT || Lloyd Free (33) || Swen Nater (23) || Lloyd Free (9) || The Summit  7,159 || 27–27 || 
|-  style="text-align:center; background:#fbb;"
| 55 || January 25 || @ Pacers || L 117–139 || Lloyd Free (27) || Swen Nater (16) || Lloyd Free (7) || Market Square Arena  8,794 || 27–28 || 
|-  style="text-align:center; background:#fbb;"
| 56 || January 27 || @ Celtics || L 108–131 || Lloyd Free (35) || Swen Nater (11) || Tied (4) || Boston Garden  15,320 || 27–29 || 
|-  style="text-align:center; background:#bfb;"
| 57 || January 29 || Suns || W 133–121 || Lloyd Free (32) || Swen Nater (21) || Swen Nater (8) || San Diego Sports Arena  11,428 || 28–29 || 
|-

|-  style="text-align:center; background:#fbb;"
| 58 || February 6 || @ Warriors || L 117–92 || Freeman Williams (29) || Swen Nater (11) || Stan Pietkiewicz (5) || Oakland-Alameda County Coliseum Arena  8,380 || 28–30 || 
|-  style="text-align:center; background:#bfb;"
| 59 || February 8 || Trail Blazers || W 118–104 || Freeman Williams (29) || Joe Bryant (12) || Tied (7) || San Diego Sports Arena  12,715 || 29–30 || 
|-  style="text-align:center; background:#fbb;"
| 60 || February 9 || @ Nuggets || L 104–123 || Freeman Williams (33) || Swen Nater (18) || Stan Pietkiewicz (7) || McNichols Sports Arena  14,662 || 29–31 || 
|-  style="text-align:center; background:#fbb;"
| 61 || February 13 || Bullets || L 103–108 || Lloyd Free (28) || Swen Nater (15) || Brian Taylor (8) || San Diego Sports Arena  9,472 || 29–32 || 
|-  style="text-align:center; background:#fbb;"
| 62 || February 17 || Kings || L 107–108 || Lloyd Free (24) || Swen Nater (10) || Brian Taylor (6) || San Diego Sports Arena  9,114 || 29–33 || 
|-  style="text-align:center; background:#fbb;"
| 63 || February 19 || Nets || L 113–123 || Freeman Williams (24) || Swen Nater (10) || Brian Taylor (6) || San Diego Sports Arena  11,709 || 29–34 || 
|-  style="text-align:center; background:#bfb;"
| 64 || February 21 || 76ers || W 104–99 || Lloyd Free (24) || Swen Nater (16) || Tied (3) || San Diego Sports Arena  13,472 || 30–34 || 
|-  style="text-align:center; background:#fbb;"
| 65 || February 24 || @ Bulls || L 102–110 || Lloyd Free (35) || Swen Nater (10) || Bill Walton (6) || Chicago Stadium  7,257 || 30–35 || 
|-  style="text-align:center; background:#fbb;"
| 66 || February 26 || @ Bucks || L 88–122 || Lloyd Free (21) || Swen Nater (15) || Lloyd Free (4) || MECCA Arena  10,938 || 30–36 || 
|-  style="text-align:center; background:#bfb;"
| 67 || February 27 || @ Pistons || W 129–113 || Lloyd Free (42) || Bill Walton (13) || Tied (7) || Pontiac Silverdome  5,229 || 31–36 || 
|-  style="text-align:center; background:#fbb;"
| 68 || February 29 || @ Kings || L 93–98 || Lloyd Free (34) || Tied (13) || Lloyd Free (4) || Checkerdome  10,561 || 31–37 || 
|-

|-  style="text-align:center; background:#fbb;"
| 69 || March 2 || Bucks || L 98–101 || Lloyd Free (22) || Swen Nater (14) || Swen Nater (3) || San Diego Sports Arena  13,841 || 31–38 || 
|-  style="text-align:center; background:#bfb;"
| 70 || March 4 || Cavaliers || W 116–105 || Lloyd Free (24) || Swen Nater (19) || Tied (5) || San Diego Sports Arena  9,024 || 32–38 || 
|-  style="text-align:center; background:#bfb;"
| 71 || March 8 || @ Jazz || W 113–98 || Lloyd Free (38) || Bill Walton (15) || Tied (4) || Salt Palace  9,462 || 33–38 || 
|-  style="text-align:center; background:#fbb;"
| 72 || March 9 || Warriors || L 107–125 || Lloyd Free (26) || Swen Nater (13) || Swen Nater (8) || San Diego Sports Arena  7,560 || 33–39 || 
|-  style="text-align:center; background:#fbb;"
| 73 || March 11 || Lakers || L 106–123 || Lloyd Free (32) || Swen Nater (16) || Tied (4) || San Diego Sports Arena  13,841 || 33–40 || 
|-  style="text-align:center; background:#bfb;"
| 74 || March 13 || Nuggets || W 116–102 || Lloyd Free (26) || Swen Nater (22) || Brian Taylor (8) || San Diego Sports Arena  6,798 || 34–40 || 
|-  style="text-align:center; background:#bfb;"
| 75 || March 15 || Suns || W 120–109 || Lloyd Free (44) || Swen Nater (16) || Tied (6) || San Diego Sports Arena  10,635 || 35–40 || 
|-  style="text-align:center; background:#fbb;"
| 76 || March 16 || @ Nuggets || L 107–127 || Lloyd Free (29) || Swen Nater (18) || Lloyd Free (4) || McNichols Sports Arena  12,497 || 35–41 || 
|-  style="text-align:center; background:#fbb;"
| 77 || March 18 || Bulls || L 101–115 || Swen Nater (24) || Swen Nater (10) || Brian Taylor (7) || San Diego Sports Arena  8,731 || 35–42 || 
|-  style="text-align:center; background:#fbb;"
| 78 || March 21 || @ SuperSonics || L 104–107|| Freeman Williams (21) || Swen Nater (9) || Tied (7) || Kingdome  22,695 || 35–43 || 
|-  style="text-align:center; background:#fbb;"
| 79 || March 23 || @ Trail Blazers || L 91–98 || Freeman Williams (25) || Swen Nater (13) || Swen Nater (9) || Memorial Coliseum  12,666 || 35–44 || 
|-  style="text-align:center; background:#fbb;"
| 80 || March 27 || Trail Blazers || L 93–96 || Swen Nater (24) || Swen Nater (19) || Swen Nater (5) || San Diego Sports Arena  10,863 || 35–45 || 
|-  style="text-align:center; background:#fbb;"
| 81 || March 28 || @ Lakers || L 88–126 || Freeman Williams (20) || Swen Nater (23) || Sidney Wicks (10) || The Forum  17,505 || 35–46 || 
|-  style="text-align:center; background:#fbb;"
| 82 || March 30 || @ Suns || L 104–122|| Freeman Williams (24) || Swen Nater (19) || Tied (7) || Arizona Veterans Memorial Coliseum  10,807 || 35–47 || 
|-

Season standings

Notes
 z, y – division champions
 x – clinched playoff spot

Record vs. opponents

Player statistics

Awards, records and milestones

Awards

Week/Month

All-Star
 Lloyd Free selected as a reserve guard for the Western Conference All-Stars.  Free would be the first and only San Diego Clipper All-Star.

Season

Records
 Swen Nater sets a franchise record of total rebounds in a single season with 1,216.  This record will not be broken until 35 years later by DeAndre Jordan with 1,226 rebounds.

Milestones

Transactions
The Clippers were involved in the following transactions during the 1979–80 season.

Trades

Free agents

Additions

Subtractions

References

Los Angeles Clippers seasons
San